This is a list of real and fictional surnamed Jenkins.

 See Jenkins (name) for the etymology of related first and last names.

Real people
The following is a list of real surnamed Jenkins.

A
Ab Jenkins (1883–1956), American racing car driver
Al Jenkins (disambiguation), several people
Alan Jenkins (engineer) (born 1947), English automotive engineer and designer
Alan Jenkins (poet) (born 1955), English poet
Albert Jenkins (footballer) (1865−1940), English footballer who formed Doncaster Rovers in 1879.
Albert Jenkins (rugby union) (1895–1953), Welsh international rugby union player
Albert G. Jenkins (1830–1864), American soldier and politician
Allan Jenkins (footballer) (born 1981), Scottish footballer
Allen Jenkins (1900–1974), American actor and singer
 Austin Jenkins (born 1989), American professional wrestler better known as Adam Cole

B
Barbara Jenkins, Trinidadian writer
Bert Jenkins (1885–1943), Welsh rugby league and rugby union footballer
Bill Jenkins (drag racer) (1930–2012), American drag racer
Bill Jenkins (politician) (born 1936), American politician
Bill Jenkins (Royal Marines officer) (1925–2002), youngest Royal Marine to win a DSO in the Second World War
 Bill Jenkins, American voice actor for FUNimation Entertainment
Bill Jenkings born as William Charles Jenkings (1915–1996), Australian writer, newspaper reporter and Bondi Beach identity
Billy Jenkins (American football) (born 1974), American football defensive back
Billy Jenkins (Australian footballer) (1914–2001), Australian rules footballer
Billy Jenkins (musician) (born 1956), English blues guitarist, composer, and bandleader
Blanche Jenkins (active 1872–1915), British portrait painter
Bob Jenkins (1947–2021), American television and radio sports announcer
Bob Jenkins (American football) (1923–2001), American football halfback
Bobo Jenkins (1916–1984), American blues guitarist, singer and songwriter
Brian Jenkins (American football) (born 1971), college football coach at Bethune-Cookman University
Brian Jenkins (politician) (born 1942), British Labour Party politician, MP for Tamworth
 Sir Brian Garton Jenkins, former Lord Mayor of London
Brian Michael Jenkins (born 1942), U.S. terrorism expert
Bryan Jenkins, Australian chief executive

C
Carlos Jenkins (born 1968), American footballer
Carter Jenkins (born 1991), American actor
Charles Jenkins (disambiguation), several people
Chris Jenkins (disambiguation), several people
Christopher Martin-Jenkins (1945–2013), cricket journalist
Clay Jenkins (born 1964), American lawyer and politician
Clive Jenkins (1926–1999), British trade unionist
Constance Lillian Jenkins (married name Constance Jenkins Macky; 1883–1961)
Cullen Jenkins (born 1981), American footballer
Cynthia Jenkins (1924–2001), New York politician

D
Dan Jenkins (1928–2019), American author and journalist
Daniel H. Jenkins (born 1963), American actor

E
Ed Jenkins (American football) (born 1950), Edward Jenkins, former American footballer
Ed Jenkins (rugby union) (born 1986), Australian rugby union player
Ed Jenkins (U.S. politician) (1933–2012), Edgar Jenkins, U.S. Representative from Georgia
Edward Jenkins (MP) (1838–1910), author and Member of Parliament (MP) for Dundee 1874–1880
Edward Jenkins (priest) (1902–1996), Anglican Dean of St David's
Edward Enoch Jenkins,  Attorney-General (Fiji) 1938–1945
Edward Hopkins Jenkins (1850–1931), American agricultural chemist
Elgton Jenkins (born 1995), American football player
Ella Jenkins (born 1924), American folk singer
Ernie Jenkins (1880–1958), Wales international rugby union player
Ernie Jenkins (baseball) (1906–1978), American baseball pitcher and manager
Evan Jenkins (footballer) (1906–90), Welsh football winger
Evan Jenkins (politician) (born 1960), United States politician from West Virginia
Evan Meredith Jenkins (1896–1985), British colonial administrator
Eveline Annie Jenkins (1893–1976), British artist and illustrator

F
Farish Jenkins (1940–2012), American paleontologist
Ferguson Jenkins (born 1943), Canadian baseball player
Florence Foster Jenkins (1868–1944), U.S. "soprano" known for her extraordinary bravery on stage
Frances C. Jenkins (1826-1915), U.S. evangelist, Quaker minister, and social reformer

G
G. Kenneth Jenkins (1918–2005), British numismatist
Geoffrey Jenkins (1920–2001), South African writer
 George Jenkins (born 1973), American dentist of The Three Doctors
George C. Jenkins (1908–2007), American production designer
George Jenkins (Australian politician) (1878–1957)
George Jenkins (soccer) (1904–1985), Canadian soccer player
George Neil Jenkins (1914–2007), British professor of oral physiology
George P. Jenkins (1914–2009), American business executive
George W. Jenkins (1907–1996), American businessman and founder of Publix
Geraint H. Jenkins (born 1946), historian of Wales and the Welsh language
Gethin Jenkins (born 1980), Welsh rugby player and coach
Gordon Jenkins (1910–1984), American musician
Graeme Jenkins (born 1958), British conductor
Gwilym Jenkins (1932–1982), Welsh statistician

H
Harold Jenkins (Shakespeare scholar) British literary scholar
 Harold Jenkins, member of Sugarman Gang British criminal
Harold Lloyd Jenkins (1933–1993) American country-western singer-songwriter. Stage name: Conway Twitty
Harry Jenkins (born 1952) is an Australian Labor politician.
Harry Jenkins, Sr. (1925–2004), Australian Labor politician
Harry Reginald Jenkins (1881–1970), New Zealand Member of Parliament
Harry W. Jenkins, Major General in the United States Marine Corps
Harry Jenkins (disambiguation), several people
Herbert George Jenkins (1876–1923), British writer and owner of publisher Herbert Jenkins Ltd
Helen Jenkins (born 1984), British triathlete
Henry Jenkins (MP) for Boroughbridge (UK Parliament constituency)
Henry Jenkins (supercentenarian)
Henry Alfred Jenkins, Australian politician
Horace Jenkins (born 1974), American basketball player
Hugh Jenkins, Baron Jenkins of Putney (1908–2004), British Labour Party politician

I
Ian Jenkins (curator), curator at the British Museum
Ian Jenkins (politician) (born 1941), Scottish politician
Ian Jenkins (Royal Navy officer) (1944–2009), former Surgeon General of the British Armed Forces
Iain Jenkins (born 1972), former Northern Ireland footballer

J
J. Geraint Jenkins (1929–2009), Welsh maritime historian and historian of rural crafts
Jack Jenkins (American football) (1921–1982), American football player
Jack Jenkins (baseball) (1942–2002), American baseball player
Jack Jenkins (rugby player) (1880–1971), Wales international rugby union player
Jack Jenkins (Welsh footballer) (1892–1946), Welsh international
Jackie 'Butch' Jenkins (1937–2001), American actor
Jackie Jenkins-Scott (born c. 1950), American business & academic administrator
 Jackie Jenkins (fl. 1990s), British writer a.k.a. Vanessa Bishop
James Allister Jenkins (1923–2012), Canadian-American mathematician
James J. Jenkins (1923–2012) American psychology professor. Played a significant role in the development of cognitive psychology.
Jay Jenkins (born 1977), professionally known as Jeezy (formerly Young Jeezy), American rapper
Jean Jenkins (ethnomusicologist) (1922–1990), American-born ethnomusicologist
Jean Jenkins (politician) (born 1938), Australian educator and senator for Western Australia
Jerry B. Jenkins (born 1949), American author
Joe Jenkins (1890–1974), American baseball player
John Jenkins, 1st Baron Glantawe (1835–1915), Welsh MP for Carmarthen
John Jenkins (American football) (born 1952), American football coach
John Jenkins (American politician), Maine state senator, mayor and candidate for Governor of Maine
John Jenkins (Australian footballer) (1936–1980), Australian footballer
John Jenkins (Australian politician) (1851–1923), American-born premier of South Australia
John Jenkins (baseball) (1896–1968), American baseball player
John Jenkins (basketball) (born 1991), American basketball player
John Jenkins (composer) (1592–1678), English composer
John Jenkins (defensive tackle) (born 1989), American football player
Sir John Jenkins (diplomat) (born 1955), British ambassador to Saudi Arabia
John Jenkins (governor) (died 1681), colonial governor of North Carolina
 Rev. John Jenkins (Gwili) (1872–1936), Welsh poet, theologian and Archdruid, 1932–1936
John Jenkins (Ifor Ceri) (1770–1829), Welsh Church of England priest and antiquarian
John Jenkins (jazz musician) (1931–1993), American saxophonist
John Jenkins (poet) (born 1949), Australian poet
John Jenkins (rugby), Welsh rugby union and rugby league footballer
John A. Jenkins (born 1950), American journalist and author
John Barnard Jenkins (1933–2020), Welsh nationalist, effective leader of Mudiad Amddiffyn Cymru in the 1960s
 John Brady Jenkins, American drug dealer in The Yogurt Connection
John Carmichael Jenkins (1809–1855), American plantation owner in the Antebellum South
John David Jenkins (1828–1876), Welsh Tractarian clergyman and railwaymen's union president
Edward Jenkins (MP), born John Edward Jenkins, 1838–1910), British barrister, author and Liberal Party politician
John Hogan Jenkins (1832–1930), British politician, MP for Chatham, 1906–1910
John Holmes Jenkins (1940–1989), American historian, antiquarian bookseller, publisher, and poker player
 Rev. John I. Jenkins (born 1953), 17th president of the University of Notre Dame, 2005–
John J. Jenkins (1843–1911), Wisconsin congressman and Puerto Rico judge
John Major Jenkins (born 1964), American author and populariser of the Maya calendar
John Paul Jenkins (born 1981), local-government councillor in Wales
 John Pickens Jenkins, better known as Bobo Jenkins (1916–1984), American blues singer and record label owner
John Theophilus Jenkins (1829–1919), physician and political figure in Prince Edward Island, Canada
Johnny Jenkins (1939–2006), American blues guitarist
John Jenkins, former director of the University of Massachusetts Minuteman Marching Band
Johnny Jenkins (racing driver) (1875–1945), early 20th-century American open-wheel racing driver
Johnny Jenkins (1939–2006), American blues guitarist
Johnny Jenkins (racing driver) (1875–1945), American car-race driver
Joseph Jenkins (disambiguation), multiple people
Joseph John Jenkins (1811–1885), English engraver and water-colour painter
Joseph Willcox Jenkins (1928–2014), American composer, professor of music, and musician
Josh Jenkins (born 1989), professional Australian rules football player

K
Karl Jenkins (born 1944), Welsh musician and composer
Katherine Jenkins (born 1980), Welsh mezzo-soprano
Kathryn Jenkins (1961–2009), Welsh hymn writer and scholar
Keith Jenkins, English postmodern historian
Ken Jenkins (born 1940), American actor
Ken Jenkins (American football) (born 1959), American footballer
Kenny Jenkins (1945–2009), Scottish footballer
Kris Jenkins (born 1979), American footballer

L
Larry "Flash" Jenkins (1955–2019), American actor, producer, director, and screenwriter 
Lauren Jenkins (born 1991), American singer-songwriter, actress, and director
Lawrence Jenkins (1924–2017), American World War II pilot and prisoner of war
 Sir Leoline Jenkins (1625–1685), Welsh lawyer and diplomat
Leon Jenkins (born 1950), American football player
Leroy Jenkins (jazz musician) (1932–2007), American composer and jazz musician
Leroy Jenkins (televangelist) (1934–2017), American televangelist
Lew Jenkins (1916–1981), American boxer
Louis Jenkins (poet) (1942–2019), American poet
Louis Jenkins (politician) (1860–1939), Canadian politician
Louise Freeland Jenkins (1888–1970), American astronomer
Luwanda Jenkins (born 1962), American politician

M
Marilyn Jenkins (1937–2020), All-American Girls Professional Baseball League player
Michael Jenkins (basketball) (born 1986), American professional basketball player
Michael Jenkins (diplomat) (1936–2013), former British diplomat
Michael Jenkins (running back) (born 1976), Canadian football player
Michael Jenkins (sportscaster) (born 1973), Comcast SportsNet sports anchor
Michael Jenkins (Unification Church) (fl. 1980s), president, Unification Church of America
Michael Jenkins (wide receiver) (born 1982), American football player
Michael A. G. Jenkins, co-creator of the Jenkins-Traub algorithm
Mick Jenkins (rapper), American rapper
Mick Jenkins (rugby), Welsh rugby footballer
Mike Jenkins (American football) (born 1985), American footballer 
Mike Jenkins (poet) (born 1953), Welsh poet and novelist
Mike Jenkins (strongman) (1982–2013), professional strongman competitor

N
Neil Jenkins, Welsh rugby union footballer and coach.
Neil Jenkins (footballer) English soccer player
Newell Sill Jenkins, American dentist and developer 
Nikara Jenkins (born 1997), Welsh rhythmic gymnast 
Niki Jenkins (born 1973), Canadian judoka
Nikko Jenkins (born 1986), American spree killer
Noam Jenkins, Canadian actor

P
Patty Jenkins, American film director and screenwriter
Paul Jenkins (actor) (1939–2013), American actor
Paul Jenkins (barrister), Chief Executive of the Treasury Solicitor's Department and Treasury Solicitor
Paul Jenkins (cricketer), English cricketer
Paul Jenkins (economist), Canadian economist and Senior Deputy Governor of the Bank of Canada
Paul Jenkins (painter) (1923–2012), American abstract expressionist painter
Paul Jenkins (poet), American academic and poet
Paul Jenkins (politician) (born 1938), Australian politician
Paul Jenkins (writer) (born 1965), British comic book writer
 Paul Jenkins, Welsh martial arts fighter, see List of mixed martial artists with the most sanctioned fights
Peter Jenkins (journalist) (1934–1992), British journalist
Philip Jenkins (born 1952), American history professor
 Philip Jenkins, drummer of Kids in Glass Houses

R
Rayshawn Jenkins (born 1994), American football player
Richard Jenkins (born 1947), American actor
Richard Jenkins (engineer) (born 1977), British engineer
Richard Jenkins (MP) (1785–1853), Member of Parliament for Shrewsbury
Richard L. Jenkins (1903–1991), American child psychiatrist
Richard Lewis Jenkins (1815–1883), New South Wales politician
Richard Burton (1925–1984), Welsh actor whose birth name was Richard Walter Jenkins
Richard Jenkyns (1782–1854), British academic administrator and Dean of Wells
Robert Jenkins (American football), former NFL player
Robert Jenkins (master mariner) (fl. 1731–1745), English master mariner who sparked the War of Jenkins' Ear
Robert Jenkins (Pennsylvania politician) (1769–1848), United States Congressman from Pennsylvania
Robert Jenkins (UK politician) (1900–1978), British Conservative Member of Parliament for Dulwich, 1951–1964
Robert H. Jenkins, Jr. (1948–1969), U.S. Marine Corps Medal of Honor recipient, killed in action in Vietnam
Robert Harold Jenkins (1873–1939), Canadian politician
Robert Thomas Jenkins (1881–1969), Welsh historian and academic
Robert John Jenkins Junior (born 1966), computer professional
Bob Jenkins, American sports announcer, born as Robert Jenkins
Bob Jenkins (American football) (1923—2001), Consensus All-American football player
Roy Jenkins, Baron Jenkins of Hillhead (1920–2003), British politician

S
Sally Jenkins (born 1960), American author and sports journalist
Samuel Jenkins, Jr. (born 1956), African-American politician
Scoville Jenkins (born 1986), American tennis player
Sheree A Jenkins, American author
Sir Simon Jenkins (born 1943), British newspaper columnist
Stephan Jenkins (born 1964), rock singer

T
Terry Jenkins (born 1963), professional darts player
Teven Jenkins (born 1998), American football player
Thomas Jenkins (disambiguation), multiple people
Thornton A. Jenkins (1811–1893), U.S. Rear Admiral
Tom Jenkins (disambiguation), multiple people
Tommy Jenkins (born 1947), English footballer
Tommy Jenkins (Australian footballer) (1902–1979)
Tristen W.E. Jenkins (Musician)

W
Walter Jenkins (1918–1985), top aide to Lyndon B. Johnson, resigned after a scandal
 Sir Walter Jenkins (civil servant) (1874–1951), British admiralty official
 William Jenkins (1825–1895), Welsh general manager of Consett Iron Company
William Jenkins (Australian politician), member of the South Australian House of Assembly
William Jenkins (Canadian politician) (1921–1995)
William Jenkins (cricketer) (1788–1844), English cricketer
William Jenkins (Labour politician) (1871–1944), former MP for Neath
William Jenkins (New Zealand) (1813–1902), New Zealand sailor, whaler, accommodation-house keeper, farmer, market gardener, horse-trainer and jockey
William Jenkins (Northern Ireland politician) (born 1904), Lord Mayor of Belfast
William Jenkins (veterinarian), former president of Louisiana State University
William Albert Jenkins (1878–1968), British politician, former MP for Brecon and Radnor
William (Bill) Jenkins (1925–2002), youngest Royal Marine to win a DSO in the Second World War
 William Fitzgerald Jenkins, better known under his pen name Murray Leinster (1896–1975), American science fiction author
William L. Jenkins (born 1936), politician from the state of Tennessee
William Miller Jenkins (1856–1941), American politician
William O. Jenkins (1878–1963), American businessman who made great wealth in Mexico
William Stanley Jenkins (1890-?), Canadian flying ace during World War I

Fictional characters and others
The following is a list of fictional and other Jenkins.

A
Abner Jenkins (Beetle, MACH-1, etc.), Marvel Comics supervillain-turned-hero
 Doctor Albert Al Jenkins, fictional character from the BBC soap opera EastEnders played by Adam Croasdell
Anya Jenkins (Buffy the Vampire Slayer)

B
Billie Jenkins (Charmed)
 Bob Jenkins, character in Almost Normal
 Bruno Jenkins, nurse in the BBC medical drama Casualty
 Bruno Jenkins, young boy in Roald Dahl's The Witches and the 1990 film based on the story

C
 Carl Jenkins, General/Doctor, Minister of Paranormal Warfare in Starship Troopers film
Carl Jenkins (Oz), an inmate of Aryan Brotherhood on the HBO drama Oz
Carl Jenkins (Starship Troopers) (Roughnecks: Starship Troopers Chronicles)
Christy Jenkins (Charmed)

E
 Ed Jenkins, fictional protagonist of a series of novelettes by Erle Stanley Gardner

G
George W. Jenkins High School, a high school in Lakeland, Florida

H
 Howell Jenkins, birthname of Wizard Howl in (Howl's Moving Castle)

L
Leeroy Jenkins, a player character and internet phenomenon from World of Warcraft
 Leeroy Jenkins, an alert (launch) sign used in many combat search and rescue (CSAR) operations in the Middle East, based on the World of Warcraft meme
 Leeroy Jenkins, a funny character act of Flip Wilson, American comedian and actor

M
 Mrs. Jenkins, John Rolfe's maid in Disney's Pocahontas II: Journey to a New World
 Mrs. Jenkins, character in Timothy Goes to School

N
 Neil Jenkins, character in Gavin & Stacey
 Nessa Jenkins, character in Gavin & Stacey
 Nicholas Jenkins, the narrator of Anthony Powell's A Dance to the Music of Time

P
Paul Jenkins (EastEnders), fictional character from EastEnders
Peter "Tucker" Jenkins, fictional character in the BBC children's programme Grange Hill, portrayed by Todd Carty

R
 Richard L. Jenkins, a marine who served on the SSV Normandy in Bioware's Mass Effect

W
 Private First Class Wallace A. Jenkins, a UNSC marine in Bungie's Halo universe Halo characters#Wallace Jenkins

See also
Jenkins (name)
Jenkin
Jenkyns
Little John
 
 

Surnames
Lists of people by surname